Uvalny is a rural locality (a settlement) in Trudovoy Selsoviet of Oktyabrsky District, Amur Oblast, Russia. The population was 70 as of 2018. There are 6 streets.

Geography 
Uvalny is located 49 km southwest of Yekaterinoslavka (the district's administrative centre) by road. Trudovoy is the nearest rural locality.

References 

Rural localities in Oktyabrsky District, Amur Oblast